The Petrini's market chain was established in San Francisco and run as a family owned business until 1989, when it was sold to a large corporation, Provigo.  The markets were widely known for having the finest meat in the San Francisco area, and the marketing strategies employed at the stores are still an inspiration for grocers nationwide.  At the beginning of the 20th century grocery stores were sometimes much like department stores with different partners owning and operating their own departments.  The founder started out operating the meat section of Lick Market on 7th and Clement in 1935 under such a scheme.  He opened three other markets within a few years of that time.  The largest Petrini's grocery store was opened in 1956 on what is still known today as Petrini Plaza, near Fulton and Masonic in San Francisco.  At the time of opening of that store, there were already four other large grocery stores in San Francisco.  The original store located at 2001 McAllister Street was torn down in 1996 and replaced by an apartment complex called The Village at Petrini Place which included a Lucky Supermarket with underground parking. 
The Stonestown location continued to operate under the name Petrini's until 1996 but took heavy losses in 1993  although the Petrini Family sold the chain in 1989 to Canadian company Provigo Inc.  
In the 70s the grocery store that occupied the Stonestown Location was called QFI which stood for Quality Food Incorporated. QFI became Petrini's in 1982. The original grocery store before QFI was called the Stonestown Market.  

Petrini's markets were known as being the very best markets in the Northern California region for gourmet meats and food.  The butchers were well trained and very well taken care of by the business.  The founder of the market, Frank Petrini, considered each of the market's employees as family, and encouraged the employees to treat each other as such.  He greeted customers he knew personally, which were most regular customers, with a hug and kiss.  Frank Petrini carefully selected the cows that were to be slaughtered for sale in his markets himself, and rejected a majority of the bovine that were used for prime meat by other markets.  Petrini's markets was the first large grocery store chain to specialize in quality gourmet food, and Frank Petrini thus created model that has been followed since by grocers both in the United States as well as in Japan, Australia and Europe.  Some of the best selections of wine, coffee beans and European food in the San Francisco area was also found at Petrini's .

Petrini's market was established by Frank Petrini, an Italian immigrant butcher from Lammari, Lucca.  He began working at age 12 in Italy, and was trained to be a butcher at age 14.  He travelled to the United States alone in 1922, being the first in his family to come.  He came directly to San Francisco with $5 in his pocket and started immediately working as a butcher from 6am to 7pm every day.  He originally wanted to go to college, but with the advice of a priest, who was the director of the English school he attended, he concentrated on becoming the best butcher in San Francisco.

The Petrini's market advertisements were famous for containing inspiring quotes, which also appeared on the wall of his stores.  These quotes earned him the nickname of "philosopher" among his friends.  These quotes were collected into a book which was published by R&E Publishing in September 1992 under the title of "The Proverbs of Frank Petrini: Food for Thought."

See also
 List of butcher shops

References

External links 
News article in The Jewish News Weekly about a rabbi who encourages Petrini's to carry passover food
1958 picture of the meat counter in the flagship store in the SF Library Historical Archives
Another picture from the SF Library Historical Archives showing Frank Petrini picking out cows
Business Wire 1996 article about closing of store
Blog posting of Petrini's fan
WorldCat Library Catalog listing for "Food for Thought," a book by the founder of Petrini's

Defunct supermarkets of the United States
Butcher shops
Food retailers of the United States

Companies based in San Francisco
Defunct companies based in the San Francisco Bay Area
Food and drink in the San Francisco Bay Area
History of San Francisco
History of the San Francisco Bay Area
Italian-American culture in San Francisco
American companies established in 1935
Retail companies established in 1935
Retail companies disestablished in 1989
1935 establishments in California
1989 disestablishments in California
Privately held companies based in California
Shops in the United States
Supermarkets based in California